Tauraco is a genus of turacos. It contains the "typical" or green turacos; though their plumage is not always green all over, the presence of significant amounts of turacoverdin-colored plumage generally sets Tauraco species apart from other Musophagidae. Indeed, as opposed to any other known birds, Tauraco turacos are the only living bird taxa that have any significant green pigment whatsoever, as the greens of many parrots etc. are due to structural color, not pigment. Their genus name was derived from a native West African name.

Taxonomy
The genus Tauraco was introduced in 1779 by the Polish naturalist Jan Krzysztof Kluk. The type species was later designated as the Guinea turaco.

Species
The genus contains 13 species.

References

External links

 
Bird genera